Trevor J. Denning  (6 December 1923 – 23 October 2009) was an English artist, sculptor, writer, and art teacher who was influential in the Birmingham art community.

Biography
Denning was born in Moseley, Birmingham, studying painting and graphics at the Birmingham School of Art from 1938 to 1942 and teaching there (from 1971 the Faculty of Art of Birmingham Polytechnic) between 1945 and 1985.

In 1947, he was one of the founders of the Birmingham Artists Committee and in 1961 he organised the Four Letter Art exhibition at the Royal Birmingham Society of Artists, having been elected a member the year before. Although there was no organisational link, Denning's work exhibiting contemporary art in the city was acknowledged as an influence by the artists who founded the Ikon Gallery in 1964, and he held a solo exhibition at the gallery two years later.
 
Denning was also a published expert on Spanish playing cards. He was made the first Member of Honour of the Asociación Española de Coleccionismo e Investigación del Naipe in 1989 and in 1993 won the Modiano Prize for research into the history of playing cards.

He and his wife were active members of Birmingham Humanists for over 30 years and participated in the scheme to ensure every MP received a copy of The God Delusion.

References

1923 births
2009 deaths
20th-century English painters
English male painters
People from Moseley
Members and Associates of the Royal Birmingham Society of Artists
Alumni of the Birmingham School of Art
Academics of the Birmingham School of Art
20th-century English male artists